Tukoji Rao Scindia  (after 1727 - 14 January 1761) aka Baba Sahib was the fourth son of Ranoji Rao Scindia and elder brother of Mahadaji Scindia. He was killed at the Third Battle of Panipat, 14 January 1761. He was also father of Kadarji Rao Scindia and Anand Rao Scindia and grandfather of Daulat Rao Scindia.

In popular culture
 In the 1994 Hindi TV series The Great Maratha, Tukoji's character was portrayed by Firoz Ali.

References

See also
Scindia

Scindia dynasty of Gwalior
1727 births
1761 deaths
Year of birth uncertain